Eleutherandra is a monotypic genus of flowering plants belonging to the family Achariaceae. The only species is Eleutherandra pes-cervi.

Its native range is Western Malesia.

References

Achariaceae
Monotypic Malpighiales genera